Sendai is the capital city of Miyagi Prefecture, Japan.

Sendai may also refer to:
Sendai Station (Miyagi), railway station in Miyagi, Japan
Sendai Station (Kagoshima), railway station in  Kagoshima, Japan
Sendai Domain, former Japanese domain of the Edo period
Sendai Airport, airport in Sendai 
Sendai Nuclear Power Plant, located near Satsumasendai, Kagoshima
Sendai class cruiser, Japanese cruiser class
Japanese cruiser Sendai, Japanese cruiser
Sendai virus, a parainfluenza virus
3133 Sendai, asteroid
Sendai University, a private university
Sendai Sachiko, Japanese professional wrestler
Sendai Girls' Pro Wrestling, a Japanese women's professional wrestling league

People with the given name
, Japanese boxing trainer

See also 
Satsumasendai, Kagoshima, merger of the former city of Sendai, Kagoshima and other towns in Satsuma District, Japan
Sendai 仙台, benefit CD for earthquake reconstruction by musicians Jan Linton and Matthew Seligman
My Stay in Sendai, album by Korean singer Lee Soo Young
All pages beginning with Sendai
Chiyo (disambiguation)
Kawauchi (disambiguation)

Japanese masculine given names